Lasch-Tayaba (Laş Tayapa) is a rural locality (a village) in Lasch-Tayaba Rural Settlement of Yalchiksky District of the Chuvash Republic, Russia, located  west of Lake Yalchik, the administrative center of the district. Population: 1036 (2012 est.).

Geography
The Lashci River flows through the village.

Infrastructure
The facilities in Lasch-Tayaba include a club, a library, a first-aid post, and a store.

The Russian Orthodox Church of the Nativity of the Virgin Mary was built in the village in 1840. It was closed and completely destroyed in the 1940s. The parish resumed its activities in 1991 in a former school building reconstructed as a church. In 2016, a new church was consecrated.

Also in the village there is a kennel "Dog hunting-Akar". In winter, the Knyazev Brothers hunting biathlon is held.

Climate
The climate is moderately continental, with long cold winters and warm summers.

Notable people
 Vasily Ektel — Chuvash writer.
 Popov Yuri Alekseevich — Chairman of the State Council of Chuvashia.

Literature 
 Яльчикский район. Краткая энциклопедия / Составители К.М.Леонтьева, Н.Ф.Малышкин. — Издание 2-е, дополненное. — Чебоксары: Чувашское книжное издательство, 2007. — С. 52—53. — 462 с. — .

References

External links 
 Lasch-Tayaba.
 Lasch-Tayaba.
 Celebration of the 400th anniversary of the village of Lasch-Tayaba
 Hunting biathlon in honor of the Knyazev brothers in the village of Lasch-Tayaba, 2019
 Building of the new church in Lasch-Tayaba
 Consecration of the new church by the Metropolitan of Cheboksary, 2016

Rural localities in Chuvashia